Elite Model Look India is an annual modelling contest held in India since 2004. The winner of the event represents India at Elite Model Look, an International modelling contest .

Marc Robinson is the present franchise holder of this contest in India. The current winners of Elite Model Look India are Dipti Sharma and Pranav Patidar. They represented India at the world finale of Elite Model Look Contest held in Milan, Italy. Earlier, Femina Look of the Year used to send its winner to the contest. However it was discontinued after 1999 for unknown reasons. Elite Model Look India started in 2004 after the launch of Elite Model Management India in 2003 owned by Sushma Puri.

History

Sheetal Mallar from Mumbai was the first winner of Femina Look of the Year contest and was the first one to represent India at Elite Model Look  contest in 1994. She was among the Top 15 finalist at the Elite Model Look 1994. Other notable winners of Femina Look of the Year include Ujjwala Raut, Carol Gracias, and Nethra Raghuraman.

2004–2012 Event
Elite Model Management launched in India in 2003 by Sushma Puri. In 2004, she sent two models to compete at Elite Model Look, Vibhinita Verma and Sucheta Sharma. In 2006 L'Oreal Paris with Elite Model Management India did a nationwide contest telecast on Zoom where Manasvi Mamgai was announced winner she went on to participate in Elite Model Look 2006 in Marrakesh.

2014–present
Since 2014, MAX India organises the event under the license owner Marc Robinson. The MAX Elite Model Look 2014 finale was held in Mumbai on October 12, 2014, the winners represented India the Elite Model Look 2014 contest held in China. Former Femina Miss India Supranational Vijaya Sharma of New Delhi and Rinku Malik of New Delhi were declared winners of the event.

Indian representatives to Elite Model Look Contest

Female Representatives
 The following women have represented India at Elite Model Look contest.

Winners Notes
 Dipti Sharma was a finalist at Campus Princess 2015.
 Vijaya Sharma was Asian Supermodel 2012-2nd Runner Up and Femina Miss India Supranational 2013 , later represented India at Miss Supranational 2013 and was among the top 20 semifinalists.
 Dayana was a finalist at the Femina Miss India 2011 contest.
 Manasvi Mamgai later won Miss Tourism International 2008 and Femina Miss India in 2010 and is now a Bollywood actress.

Male Representatives
 The following men have represented India at Elite Model Look contest.

Gallery

References

External links
Elite Model Look India Official Facebook
Official website

Indian awards
Entertainment events in India
Annual events in India
Beauty pageants in India
2004 establishments in Maharashtra